Fuxing Township is a rural township borders on Lukang in northwestern Changhua County, Taiwan.

Geography
Fuxing encompasses  and a population of 45,436, including 23,717 males and 21,719 females as of January 2023.

Administrative divisions
The township comprises 22 villages: Dalun, Dingnian, Ergang, Fubao, Funan, Fuxing, Maicuo, Panpo, Panshe, Qiaotou, Sanbian, Sanhe, Shewei, Tongan, Waipu, Waizhong, Wanfeng, Xianian, Xishi, Xiucuo, Yuanzhong and Zengping.

Tourist attractions
 Fuxing Arch Bridge
 Cheese Agriculture Area
 Fubao Wetland
 Fuxing Barn
 Old Canon Flat
 Fuxing seashell temple

Notable natives
 Chen Chin-ting, member of Legislative Yuan (1999–2008)
 Huang Chao-shun, member of Legislative Yuan (1993–2020)

References

External links

 Changhua County Fuxing Town

Townships in Changhua County